Cheburikha is a rural locality (a settlement) in Dalny Selsoviet, Rubtsovsky District, Altai Krai, Russia. The population was 65 as of 2013. There are 2 streets.

Geography 
Cheburikha is located 50 km east of Rubtsovsk (the district's administrative centre) by road. Novovoznesenka is the nearest rural locality.

References 

Rural localities in Rubtsovsky District